In botany, an evergreen is a plant which has foliage that remains green and functional through more than one growing season. This also pertains to plants that retain their foliage only in warm climates, and contrasts with deciduous plants, which completely lose their foliage during the winter or dry season.

Evergreen species

There are many different kinds of evergreen plants, both trees and shrubs. Evergreens include:
Most species of conifers (e.g., pine, hemlock, Spruce, and Fir), but not all (e.g., larch).
Live oak, holly, and "ancient" gymnosperms such as cycads
Most angiosperms from frost-free climates, and rainforest trees
All Eucalypts
Clubmosses and relatives
Bamboos

The Latin binomial term , meaning "always green", refers to the evergreen nature of the plant, for instance
Cupressus sempervirens (a cypress)
Lonicera sempervirens (a honeysuckle)
Sequoia sempervirens (a sequoia)

Leaf longevity in evergreen plants varies from a few months to several decades (over thirty years in the Great Basin bristlecone pine).

Evergreen families 

Japanese umbrella pine is unique in that it has its own family of which it is the only species.

Differences between evergreen and deciduous species 
Evergreen and deciduous species vary in a range of morphological and physiological characters. Generally, broad-leaved evergreen species have thicker leaves than deciduous species, with a larger volume of parenchyma and air spaces per unit leaf area. They have larger leaf biomass per unit leaf area, and hence a lower specific leaf area. Construction costs do not differ between the groups. Evergreens have generally a larger fraction of total plant biomass present as leaves (LMF), but they often have a lower rate of photosynthesis.

Reasons for being evergreen or deciduous

Deciduous trees shed their leaves usually as an adaptation to a cold or dry/wet season. Evergreen trees also lose leaves, but each tree loses its leaves gradually and not all at once. Most tropical rainforest plants are considered to be evergreens, replacing their leaves gradually throughout the year as the leaves age and fall, whereas species growing in seasonally arid climates may be either evergreen or deciduous. Most warm temperate climate plants are also evergreen. In cool temperate climates, fewer plants are evergreen.

In areas where there is a reason for being deciduous, e.g. a cold season or dry season, evergreen plants are usually an adaptation of low nutrient levels. Additionally, they usually have hard leaves and have an excellent water economy due to scarce resources in the area in which they reside. The excellent water economy within the evergreen species is due to high abundance when compared to deciduous species. Whereas deciduous trees lose nutrients whenever they lose their leaves. In warmer areas, species such as some pines and cypresses grow on poor soils and disturbed ground. In Rhododendron, a genus with many broadleaf evergreens, several species grow in mature forests but are usually found on highly acidic soil where the nutrients are less available to plants. In taiga or boreal forests, it is too cold for the organic matter in the soil to decay rapidly, so the nutrients in the soil are less easily available to plants, thus favoring evergreens.

In temperate climates, evergreens can reinforce their own survival; evergreen leaf and needle litter has a higher carbon-nitrogen ratio than deciduous leaf litter, contributing to a higher soil acidity and lower soil nitrogen content. This is the case with Mediterranean evergreen seedlings, which have unique C and N storages that allow stored resources to determine fast growth within the species, limiting competition and bolstering survival. These conditions favor the growth of more evergreens and make it more difficult for deciduous plants to persist. In addition, the shelter provided by existing evergreen plants can make it easier for younger evergreen plants to survive cold and/or drought.

See also

Semi-deciduous (semi-evergreen)

References

External links

Plants
Botany
Trees